The Chinese Ambassador to Mongolia is the official representative of the People's Republic of China to Mongolia

List of representatives

References 

 
Mongolia
China